Long Term Capital Holdings v. United States, 330 F. Supp. 2d 122 (D. Conn. 2004), was a court case argued before the United States District Court for the District of Connecticut that concerned a tax shelter used by Long-Term Capital Management, a failed hedge fund.

The tax shelter had been designed by Babcock & Brown for Long-Term Capital to shelter its short-term trading gains from 1997.

The case was an appeal of an Internal Revenue Service denial of the plaintiffs' claim of $106,058,228 in capital losses during the 1997 tax year and associated penalties. After a bench trial, Judge Janet Bond Arterton ruled, on August 27, 2004, that the transactions employed by Long-Term Capital Holdings did not have economic substance and so were disregarded for tax purposes.

References

External links

A Tax Shelter, Deconstructed, a New York Times article about the case

United States taxation and revenue case law
Long-Term Capital Management
2004 in United States case law
2004 in Connecticut
United States district court cases